The Campeonato Acreano Segunda Divisão (English: Campeonato Acreano Second Division), sometimes referred as Campeonato Acriano Segunda Divisão, is the second tier of the football league of the state of Acre, Brazil.

Played in only three occasions during the amateur period (1951, 1970 and 1977), the competition returned to an active status in 2011. In 2019, however, the competition was not disputed.

Format

2018 Second Division
The two clubs face each other in a home-and-away playoff, with the winner achieving promotion to the first division.

Clubs

2018 Second Division

Independência Futebol Clube
Náuas Esporte Clube

List of champions

Titles by team

References

External links
  
 Campeonato Acreano Second Division at RSSSF

 
State football leagues in Brazil